Likas is a sub-district in the city of Kota Kinabalu, Malaysia.

Likas may also refer to:

 Likas Tarigan (1924–2016), Indonesian politician and teacher
 Harry Likas (1924–2017), American tennis player
 Likas Stadium, Likas, Kota Kinabalu